The concept of included angle is discussed at:

 Congruence of triangles
 Solution of triangles